The Statute of Jewry was a statute issued by Henry III of England in 1253. In response to England's anti-Jewish hatred, Henry attempted to segregate and debase England's Jews with oppressive laws which included imposing the wearing of a yellow Jewish badge to invite the Christian public's disdain.

Articles
The statute had thirteen articles. They contained the following provisions:

 Article One provided that any Jew could only remain in England only if he or she would "serve Us in some way".
 Article Two deemed that synagogues could not be constructed, and only those that existed in the time of King John could stand.
 Article Three demanded that Jews lower their voices in synagogues, so that Christians could not hear them.
 Article Four placed a duty on Jews to pay to their local Christian church.
 Article Five banned Christian (wet) nurses and servants working for Jews, and banned all Christians from eating with Jews or "abiding" with them in their houses.
 Article Six banned Jews from buying and eating meat during Lent.
 Article Seven banned Jews from disparaging or publicly disputing the Christian faith.
 Article Eight banned "secret familiarity" between Jewish men and Christian women, and Christian men and Jewish women.
 Article Nine commanded that "every Jew wear his badge conspicuously on his breast".
 Article Ten banned Jews from churches, except for 'transit'.
 Article Eleven barred Jews from hindering another's conversion.
 Article Twelve required Jews to obtain a license to live in any town other than those with established Jewish communities.
 Article Thirteen set out that the "justices of the Jews" were to enforce the articles, and that they were to be "rigorously observed on pain of forfeiture of the chattels of the said Jews".

References

Bibliography
 
 

1253 in England
1250s in law
Jewish English history
Henry III of England